Susan Johanson  (née Powell; born March 13, 1930) is a Canadian sex educator, public speaker, and registered nurse.

Biography

Early life and career
Johanson was born Susan Powell in Toronto, Ontario, to Wilfrid Powell, a decorated British war hero, and an affluent Ontario-born Irish Protestant mother, Ethel Bell. Her great-uncle was Lord Baden-Powell. Her mother died when Johanson was ten. Johanson attended nursing school in St. Boniface Hospital in Winnipeg, graduating as a registered nurse. Soon after, she married a Swedish-Canadian electrician named Ejnor Johanson. They had three children: Carol, Eric and Jane. The family moved to North York, where Johanson kept house and raised her children.

In 1970, Johanson opened a birth control clinic in Don Mills CI high school, the first of its kind in Canada. She worked there as coordinator for 18 years. She continued her education at the Toronto Institute of Human Relations (a postgraduate course in counseling and communication), the University of Toronto (family planning), and the University of Michigan (human sexuality), graduating as a counselor and sex educator.

Radio and TV programs
Johanson first achieved popularity as a sex educator and therapist hosting her own show on rock radio station Q107 during the 1980s. The show, entitled Sunday Night Sex Show, transitioned into a TV talk show of the same name on the community television, Rogers TV in 1985. In 1996 it became a national show on the Women's Television Network (WTN). It ended in 2005.

In January 2002 reruns of the show began to be replayed to American audiences on Oxygen Media. The recorded program was very popular, but American viewers missed the opportunity to call in and ask their own questions. The U.S. version of Sunday Night Sex Show, called Talk Sex with Sue Johanson, produced especially for American audiences, debuted in November 2002 on Oxygen. Talk Sex with Sue Johanson was divided into several segments, all covering the following topics: sexual life, love and relationships. Call-in segment included viewers' live calls with questions being answered by Johanson with discussions on a variety of sex topics. The show also included a sex quiz, a sex poll where viewers could vote via the internet and see the results at the end of the episode, and included important sexual news and information.

On May 7, 2008, it was announced that the next Sunday night's episode of the show would be its last, ending the show's run after six seasons.

Johanson has made appearances on the Late Show with David Letterman, The Tonight Show with Jay Leno, and Late Night with Conan O'Brien.

Acting

Johanson appeared in two episodes of Degrassi Junior High and two episodes of Degrassi: The Next Generation. She played Dr. Sally, a radio host and sex educator that basically was a version of the real life Johanson. During her Degrassi Junior High appearances, she was famously one of the early supporters of The Zit Remedy, a band fronted by Joey Jeremiah (played by actor Pat Mastroianni).

Documentary

A full-length documentary about Johanson was released in 2022. Entitled Sex With Sue, the documentary chronicles Johanson's life story, directed by Canadian documentarian & filmmaker Lisa Rideout.

Books
Johanson is the author of three books: Talk Sex, Sex Is Perfectly Natural but Not Naturally Perfect, and Sex, Sex, and More Sex. All of them cover the sex topics from different points and include the detailed answers of the most delicate questions asked commonly about sexual life, Johanson's advice and health information.

Johanson was also the author of a weekly column published in the Health section of the Toronto Star newspaper.

Awards and honours
Johanson's work educating and informing the public about birth control and sexual health earned her Canada's second highest civilian honour (after the Order of Merit), appointment to the Order of Canada in 2001, for lifetime achievement. In 2010, Johanson was presented the Bonham Centre Award from the Mark S. Bonham Centre for Sexual Diversity Studies for her contributions to the advancement and education of issues around sexual identification.

References

External links
Talk Sex with Sue Johanson

Conan Talks Sex With Sue Johanson - "Late Night With Conan O'Brien

1930 births
Canadian nurses
Canadian women nurses
Canadian talk radio hosts
Canadian television hosts
Canadian people of British descent
Canadian people of Irish descent
Living people
Members of the Order of Canada
Writers from Toronto
Canadian relationships and sexuality writers
Sex educators
University of Toronto alumni
University of Michigan alumni
Canadian women radio hosts
Canadian women television hosts
Canadian columnists
Canadian women columnists